Kamyshly (Qamışlı) is a rural locality (a village) in Bulgakovsky Selsoviet, Ufimsky District, Bashkortostan, Russia. The population was 758 as of 2010. There are 11 streets.

Geography 
Kamyshly is located 32 km south of Ufa (the district's administrative centre) by road. Polyany is the nearest rural locality.

References 

Rural localities in Ufimsky District